Lemont is a station on Metra's Heritage Corridor in Lemont, Illinois. In Metra's zone-based fare system, Lemont is in zone E. As of 2018, Lemont is the 105th busiest of Metra's 236 non-downtown stations, with an average of 455 weekday boardings.

As of 2022, Lemont is served by three inbound trains in the morning and three outbound trains in the evening on weekdays only.

Lemont Station was originally built by the Chicago and Alton Railroad in 1859 and designed in a manner similar to that of  station. The tracks run parallel to the Illinois and Michigan Canal, and shares the right-of-way with Amtrak's Lincoln Service and Texas Eagle trains, however, no Amtrak trains stop here.

References

External links 

Station House from Google Maps Street View

Metra stations in Illinois
Former Chicago and Alton Railroad stations
Railway stations in the United States opened in 1859
Railway stations in Cook County, Illinois